Matt Gafa (born 31 August 1978) is an Australian former professional rugby league footballer who played in the 1990s and 2000s. He was a Malta international. He last played for Harlequins RL in the Super League. He had previously played for the Canberra Raiders in the NRL and has also played in Elite One Championship in France.
In the past he had also operated in the  role.

Playing career
Gafa made his first grade debut for Canberra in Round 1 1997 against Cronulla-Sutherland.  In 2003, Gafa was a member of the reserve grade premiership winning team scoring an individual 348 points.  

After a 6 year absence from first grade, Gafa returned to the team in 2004 and became a regular starter before departing for England at the end of 2005.  Gafa joined Harlequins in 2006 who were previously known as the London Broncos.

At one point in his career at Harlequins, he was the leading try-scorer in 2008's Super League XIII running in 4-tries in the opening two rounds of the engage Super League.

Gafa left Harlequins at the end of 2009 to return to Australia.  Gafa then became captain of the Belconnen United Scholars in the Canberra Raiders Cup.

Post playing
Gafa currently works for the Australian Bureau of Statistics in Belconnen.

References

External links
 Quins RL Profile
 Quins swoop for Australian Gafa
 Pulling up trees

1978 births
Living people
Australian people of Maltese descent
Australian expatriate sportspeople in England
Australian rugby league players
Canberra Raiders players
London Broncos players
Malta national rugby league team players
Rugby league centres
Rugby league players from Canberra
Rugby league second-rows
Rugby league wingers